Sung Yoo-bin (born 25 July 2000) is a South Korean actor.

Filmography

Film

Television series

Web series

Awards and nominations

References

External links 
 
 
 

2000 births
Living people
South Korean male television actors
South Korean male film actors